This page details hurling records in Ireland.

All-Ireland Championship

Final

Team
Most wins: 36 (Kilkenny), 1904, 1905, 1907, 1909, 1911, 1912, 1913, 1922, 1932, 1933, 1935, 1939, 1947, 1957, 1963, 1967, 1969, 1972, 1974, 1975, 1979, 1982, 1983, 1992, 1993, 2000, 2002, 2003, 2006, 2007, 2008, 2009, 2011, 2012, 2014, 2015.
Most consecutive All-Ireland titles: 4, Cork (1941, 1942, 1943, 1944) and Kilkenny (2006, 2007, 2008, 2009)
Most appearances: 63, Kilkenny (1893, 1895, 1897, 1898, 1904, 1905, 1907, 1909, 1911, 1912, 1913, 1916, 1922, 1926, 1931, 1932, 1933, 1935, 1936, 1937, 1939, 1940, 1945, 1946, 1947, 1950, 1957, 1959, 1963, 1964, 1966, 1967, 1969, 1971, 1972, 1973, 1974, 1975, 1978, 1979, 1982, 1983, 1987, 1991, 1992, 1993, 1998, 1999, 2000, 2002, 2003, 2004, 2006, 2007, 2008, 2009, 2010, 2011, 2012, 2014, 2015, 2016, 2019.
Most appearances without winning: 11, Galway (1924, 1925, 1928, 1929, 1953, 1958, 1975, 1979, 2012 (Draw), 2012, 2018)
Biggest win: 1896: 34 points, Tipperary (8-14) vs. Dublin (0-4)
All-Ireland Victory in Every Decade: 14, 1880s - 2010s, Tipperary

Individual

Most wins on the field of play: 10:
Henry Shefflin (Kilkenny) (2000, 2002, 2003, 2006, 2007, 2008, 2009, 2011, 2012, 2014

Most wins (including as a substitute): 9:
Noel Hickey (Kilkenny) (2000, 2002, 2003, 2006, 2007, 2008, 2009, 2011, 2012)
Noel Skehan (Kilkenny) (1963 (sub), 1967 (sub), 1969 (sub), 1972, 1974, 1975, 1979, 1982, 1983)
Most final appearances: 15:
Henry Shefflin (Kilkenny) (1999, 2000, 2002, 2003, 2004, 2006, 2007, 2008, 2009, 2010, 2011, 2012 and replay, 2014 and replay)
Winners of All-Ireland medals on the field of play in three decades::
John Doyle (Tipperary) (1949, 1950, 1951, 1958, 1961, 1962, 1964, 1965)
Declan Ryan (Tipperary) (1989, 1991, 2001)
Frank Cummins (Kilkenny) (1969, 1972, 1974, 1975, 1979, 1982, 1983)
Jimmy Doyle (Tipperary) (1958, 1961, 1962, 1964, 1965, 1971)
Paddy 'Balty' Ahern (Cork) (1919, 1926, 1927, 1929, 1931)
Tommy Doyle (Tipperary) (1937, 1945, 1949, 1950, 1951)

Hurling in Ireland
Hurling records and statistics